Gary Wilkinson is an English rugby league coach who was head coach of the Sheffield Eagles and subsequently in temporary charge of Doncaster.

Wilkinson had a career as a player in the amateur leagues in Hull before moving into coaching where he proved he could develop young players and produce winning teams. After a successful spell as Hull Kingston Rovers's Academy boss he took over the first team in 2002, winning the Northern Rail Cup and reaching the quarter finals of the promotion play-offs. He fell victim to changing fortunes in the Hull Kingston Rovers' boardroom and moved on to Hull F.C. as under-21s coach and had a brief spell on the backroom staff at Doncaster. In 2004 he was appointed coach of the successful GB Students' squad. In 2006 he was head coach of the Sheffield Eagles.

Wilkinson was a part-time coach at the Eagles, on weekdays he runs a pest control business in Hull. When he was appointed at the start of the 2006 season he immediately helped the Eagles by bringing in players from the Hull area and from the student game. The team took time to gel but eventually finished second in National League Two after an eleven-game unbeaten run, qualifying for the play-offs. They then beat Crusaders and Swinton to gain promotion to National League One. He resigned as the Eagles' head coach on 15 October 2006, citing personal reasons.

In April 2007 Wilkinson made a dramatic return to rugby league coaching when he took temporary charge of Doncaster following the suspension of their coach Keiran Dempsey and his assistant. His first game in charge was against the Sheffield Eagles at the Don Valley Stadium and Wilkinson's team recorded a victory by 24 points to 20. In May 2007 Doncaster entered into a CVA to avoid potential liquidation and Wilkinson was told not to continue as coach.

External links
Hull KR history
Doncaster RLFC website

Living people
Doncaster R.L.F.C. coaches
English rugby league coaches
Hull Kingston Rovers coaches
Sheffield Eagles coaches
Year of birth missing (living people)
Rugby articles needing expert attention